Charles Joseph Flannigan  (also Flanagan) (1891–1930) was a professional baseball player.  He played for the St. Louis Browns in 1913.

External links

1891 births
1930 deaths
St. Louis Browns players
Major League Baseball outfielders
Baseball players from California
New Orleans Pelicans (baseball) players